Alex Blackwell (born 1983) is a female cricketer for New South Wales and Australia.

Alex Blackwell may also refer to:
 Alex Blackwell (basketball) (born 1970), American basketball player
 Alexander Blackwell (17001747), Scottish adventurer

See also 
 Blackwell (surname) for other people with that surname